Sumayya Usmani is a Pakistani-born author, writer and food educator based in Scotland.

Biography
Usmani was born in Karachi, Pakistan, and moved to England in 2006, and to Glasgow in 2015. Her early childhood was spent on board ship as her father was a merchant navy captain. She practised law for 12 years before developing a career as a food writer, with a blog called My Tamarind Kitchen.

Her first published book, Summers Under the Tamarind Tree: Recipes & Memories From Pakistan (2016, Frances Lincoln) was listed by The Independent in its "11 best new cookbooks 2016", described as "spellbinding" and "an unprecedentedly authentic snapshot into the culinary culture of this often overlooked country". Her next book Mountain Berries and Desert Spice: Sweet Inspiration From the Hunza Valley to the Arabian Sea with photographs by Joanna Yee was published in 2017. Her third book, a food memoir called Andaza for which she won the Scottish Book Trust's Next Chapter Award 2021, is to be published in April 2023.   she was studying for a master's degree in creative writing at the University of Glasgow and working on a book which she describes as "a braided narrative of folklore, food and history from an ancient city in my homeland".

Selected publications

References

External links

Living people
Women food writers
Pakistani food writers
Pakistani emigrants to the United Kingdom
Pakistani bloggers
Pakistani women bloggers
Writers from Karachi
21st-century Pakistani women writers
Year of birth missing (living people)